Alexander Attinger (born 8 January 1986) is a Swiss curler from Dübendorf.

Attinger has played in one international event, the 2006 World Junior Curling Championships. He was the alternate on the Swiss team, but ended up playing in six games. The team, skipped by Christian von Gunten finished in 8th place.

Attinger has played on the World Curling Tour since 2007 when he played in that year's Swiss Cup Basel. Attinger's best event to date was losing the 2012 DEKALB Superspiel final to William Lyburn.

External links
 

1986 births
Swiss male curlers
Living people
People from Dübendorf
Sportspeople from the canton of Zürich